Coole Park Manor is a historic summer cottage in La Pointe, Wisconsin. It was built in 1913 and added to the National Register of Historic Places on July 1, 2005.  

The property is located on the southern shoreline of Madeline Island, and consists of the main house, workshop, garden, and three cabins. The property is also located in the neighborhood of a few other historically important places, including the La Pointe Indian Cemetery, and the LaPointe headquarters of the American Fur Company.

See also
National Register of Historic Places listings in Ashland County, Wisconsin

References

Buildings and structures in Ashland County, Wisconsin
National Register of Historic Places in Ashland County, Wisconsin
Ashland County, Wisconsin
Buildings and structures completed in 1913
American Fur Company
1913 establishments in Wisconsin